Ángel Díaz de Entresotos y Mier (5 December 1927 – 16 November 2009) was a Spanish politician and former President of Cantabria between 1984 and 1987.

References

1927 births
2009 deaths
Presidents of Cantabria
People from Santander, Spain